Alms or ALMS may refer to:

Alms, charitable giving
 The American Le Mans Series, an enclosed-wheel enclosed-cockpit 4-wheel custom-built prototype-sportscar racecar racing series
 The Asian Le Mans Series, an enclosed-wheel enclosed-cockpit 4-wheel custom-built prototype-sportscar racecar racing series

People
Frederick H. Alms, namesake of the Cincinnati park Alms Park
James Alms (1728–1791), Royal Navy officer
Paige Alms (born 1988), Hawaiian surfer

Places
 Alms Park, Cincinnati, Ohio, US; a city park

Music
Alms (album), an album by Re:
"Alms", a song by The Futureheads from their album The Futureheads
"Alms! Alms!", a song from the 2007 musical-thriller film Sweeney Todd: The Demon Barber of Fleet Street

Other uses
 ALMS Conference, an international conference on Archives, Libraries, Museums and Special Collections

See also

 
 Alms tax
 Alms box
 Alms house
 Alms-free
 ALMS1 (Alstom syndrome 1) a gene and protein
 Alms1, centrosome and basal body associated protein
 

 Alm (disambiguation)
Surnames from given names
German-language surnames